Oworonshoki is a suburb in Lagos State, Nigeria. The community is under the Kosofe Local Government Area of Lagos State. Geographically, Oworonshoki is pivotal to Lagos state as it connects the Mainland and Island areas of Lagos via the Third Mainland Bridge. It also hosts a terminus of the Apapa Oworonshoki Expressway.

Under Kosofe Local Government Area, Oworonshoki has two wards, Ward A and Ward B.

The Longest Road in Oworonshoki is Oworo road.

References 
https://www.channelstv.com/2021/12/03/in-lagos-district-slum-party-brings-hope-and-life/

Populated places in Lagos State